Junayd Baghdadi (circa 1396) was a 14th-century illustrator and a royal painter (naqqash-i sultani) at the time of the Jalayirid Sultanate in Baghdad. He was named a student of Shams al-Din by Dust Muhammad.

He is generally as the illustrator for the Divan of Khvaju Kirmani, published in 1396 in Baghdad. This manuscript is "the most firmly dated illustrated and high-quality Jalayirid manuscript". One of the paintings was signed by Junayd himself. He may also have been the illustrator of the paintings in Freer Divan's paintings.

References

Persian miniature painters
People from Baghdad
14th-century Iranian painters